The Kidnapped Bride is a 1914 American film featuring Oliver Hardy.

Plot

Cast
 Eva Bell as Lena Krautheimer
 Raymond McKee as Emil Schweitzer
 Oliver Hardy as Daniel Cassidy (as Babe Hardy)
 Frank Griffin as Tango (as Frank C. Griffin)

See also
 List of American films of 1914
 Oliver Hardy filmography

External links

1914 films
1914 short films
American silent short films
American black-and-white films
1914 comedy films
Films directed by Frank Griffin
Silent American comedy films
American comedy short films
1910s American films
1910s English-language films